Mad-Dog (Robert "Buzz" Baxter) is a fictional character appearing in American comic books published by Marvel Comics.

Publication history

Buzz Baxter's first appearance was in Miss America Comics #2 (1944), as the boyfriend of Patsy Walker. He continued to appear as a supporting character of Patsy until her comic was cancelled in 1965. He reappeared, alongside Patsy, in Amazing Adventures #13 (Jul. 1972) and made occasional appearances afterwards. He was revamped as the villain Mad-Dog in The Defenders #125 (Nov. 1983).

Fictional character biography
Robert "Buzz" Baxter was born in Centerville, California. He and Patsy Walker were high school sweethearts, and got married shortly after graduation. After high school, he joined the USAF, serving in the Vietnam War, eventually earning the rank of colonel. He later became the security consultant to the Brand Corporation. He began an investigation of the Beast's appearances at the Brand Corporation. While he was working for Brand, he and Patsy grew distant and got divorced. Baxter had the Squadron Supreme capture the Avengers, and held them prisoner at a Brand facility. Baxter confronted his ex-wife Patsy, and was forced by the Hellcat to release the Avengers from Brand captivity.

Baxter later allowed Roxxon, the company to which Brand was a subsidiary, to experiment on him and mutate him. As Mad-Dog, he became a mercenary, and directed Mutant Force. He crashed the wedding of Daimon Hellstrom and Patsy Walker to abduct Patsy and the Defenders. He was defeated by Daimon Hellstrom, and placed in S.H.I.E.L.D. custody along with Mutant Force. However, he escaped with Mutant Force. He became an agent of the third Secret Empire. As security chief, he aided the Secret Empire and its leader, Professor Power, in an attempt to start World War III. Together with Mutant Force, he battled and was defeated by the Defenders.

Much later, Mad-Dog abducted and intended to kill the Hellcat, but was defeated by her. He joined Crossfire and other costumed criminals in an attack on Hawkeye. He also unsuccessfully attacked the Fantastic Four during the "Acts of Vengeance".

In Toronto, Baxter was caught up in the violent influence of the release of the Sk'ar. He fought Gamma Flight, but was teleported away by Manikin's future self. Roxxon hired him and Angar the Screamer to lead a group of operatives in a twofold mission: infiltrate and destroy S.H.I.E.L.D. The villains stormed the S.H.I.E.L.D. Helicarrier, but the new Super-Agents of S.H.I.E.L.D. eventually defeated Baxter and the other villains. He fought Crossbones, as the first of five competitors at a super-villain convention on Boca Caliente and was quickly defeated.  He was later present when Captain America, Diamondback, the Falcon and Shang-Chi battled numerous villains on the island. He next worked with Taskmaster when he was sent to test the skills of Siren, an Ultraverse resident on Earth-616.

Powers and abilities
Mad-Dog gained superhuman powers as a result of bionic engineering and cellular augmentation by the Roxxon Mutagenic Department and by the third Secret Empire. He was given superhuman strength and endurance, and superhumanly acute animal-like senses, particularly hearing and smell.  He also possesses bionically strengthened jaw muscles, and has been given large, hollow, fang-like canine teeth. His teeth can emit a foaming chemical poison, to which he himself is immune, which can induce paralysis and possibly death if it enters a victim's bloodstream through Mad-Dog's bite.  However, the process which gave him his powers also gave him insanity, which clouds his judgment and behavior.

He now possesses a large animalistic appearance, with pointed ears, claws on both his hands and feet, and a coat of fur on his limbs and torso.

Robert Baxter has received combat training from the U.S. Air Force.

References

External links
 

Characters created by Ruth Atkinson
Comics characters introduced in 1944
Fictional characters from California
Fictional characters with superhuman durability or invulnerability
Fictional characters with superhuman senses
Fictional colonels
Fictional United States Air Force personnel
Fictional Vietnam War veterans
Marvel Comics characters who can move at superhuman speeds
Marvel Comics characters with superhuman strength
Marvel Comics male supervillains
Marvel Comics military personnel
Marvel Comics mutates
Marvel Comics supervillains
Timely Comics characters